Celeste or Céleste is a given name or surname which derives from the Latin caelestis, meaning heavenly or celestial. 

The name may refer to:

Given name

Performers
 Celeste (singer), (born 1994), British-Jamaican singer-songwriter
 Celeste Anderson (also known as BiiTTERSWEET), Filipino Canadian competitive gamer and reality television personality
 Céleste Alkan (1812-1897), French musician
 Celeste Bonin or Kaitlyn (wrestler) (born 1986), American model, bodybuilder and professional wrestler 
 Celeste Buckingham (born 1995), Slovak-American singer
 Celeste Carballo (born 1956), Argentine singer-songwriter rock, blues, hard rock, punk and tango
 Celeste Cid (born 1984), Argentine actress
 Celeste Coltellini (1760-1828), Italian soprano
 Celeste Cortesi (born 1997), Filipino-Italian model and beauty pageant titleholder
 Celeste Dandeker (born c. 1952), British dancer 
 Celeste Dodwell, British and Australian actress who played Melody Jones in the Australian soap opera Home and Away
 Celeste Headlee (born 1969), American radio and television host in Public Broadcasting 
 Celeste Holm (1917–2012), American stage, film and television actress
 Celeste Jaguaribe de Matos Faria (1873–1938), Brazilian composer, poet, singer and teacher
 Celeste Johnson (born 1959), known as Celeste in Italy, American model who became successful as a TV presenter and singer in Italy
 Celeste Legaspi (born 1950), Filipino singer and actress
 Celeste Mendoza (1930-1998), Cuban singer
 Céleste Mogador (1824–1909), French dancer and writer also known as Mogador
 Celeste O'Connor (born 1998), American actress
 Celeste Thorson (born 1984), American actress, model, screenwriter and activist
 Celeste Yarnall (1944–2018), American actress

Writers
 Celeste, a pseudonym of American-born, British astrologer Patric Walker
 Celeste De Blasis (1946–2001), American author of historical romance novels
 Celeste Katz, American senior politics writer
 Celeste McCollough (1927–2023), American psychologist
 Celeste Ng (born 1980), American author and novelist
 Celeste Olalquiaga, Venezuelan scholar
 Celeste Comegys Peardon (1898–1988), American writer and educator
 Celeste Raspanti (born 1928), American playwright
 Celeste West (1942–2008), American librarian and lesbian author
 Celeste M. A. Winslow (1837–1908), American author

Sportspeople
 Celeste Boureille (born 1994), American soccer player
 Celeste D’Arcangelo (born 2003), Argentinian rhythmic gymnast 
 Celeste Ferraris (born 1970), Australian synchronized swimmer 
 Celeste García (born 1964), Peruvian swimmer
 Celeste Plak (born 1995), Dutch volleyball player
 Celeste Poltera, Swiss bobsledder
 Celeste Raack (born 1994), Australian cricketer 
 Celeste Troche (born 1981), Paraguayan golfer

Other
 Celeste Baranski, American electronic engineer, entrepreneur, and executive who helped create several pioneering electronic devices including early versions of the tablet computer
 Celeste Beard (born 1963), convicted American murderer
 Céleste Boursier-Mougenot (born 1961), French artist
Celeste Brackett Newcomer (1871–1951), American educator, clubwoman
 Céleste Bulkeley (1759–1832), French soldier in the Catholic and Royal Army during the war in the Vendée
 Celeste Farotti (1864–1928), violin maker in the modern Milanese school
 Celeste de Longpré Heckscher (1860–1928), American composer
 Celeste Kaplan (née Strack, 1915-1998), American social worker, educator, and activist
 Céleste Lett (born 1951), French politician, member of the National Assembly of France
 Celeste Liddle (born 1978), Australian Indigenous feminist 
Celeste Mountjoy, Australian artist and illustrator 
 Celeste M. Stiehl (née Sullivan) (born 1925), American politician
 Celeste Tanfani, Italian pastellist artist (18th century)
 Celeste Ulrich (1924-2011), American educator and leader in the field of physical education
 Celeste A. Wallander (born 1961), American international relations expert with a focus on Russia
 Celeste Woss y Gil (1890–1985) Dominican Republic painter

Middle name
 Crystal Celeste Grant (born 1980), American actress
 Dorothy Celeste Boulding Ferebee (1898–1980), American obstetrician and civil rights activist
 Jessica Celeste Michibata (born 1984), Japanese fashion model
 Louis Celeste Lecesne (c. 1796 or 1798–1847), an anti-slavery activist from the Caribbean islands
 María Celeste Arrarás (born 1960), better known as María Celeste, Puerto Rican broadcast journalist and author
 Tennessee Celeste Claflin (1844–1923), also known as Tennie C., American suffragist best known as the first woman, along with her sister Victoria Woodhull, to open a Wall Street brokerage firm

Surname
 Arianny Celeste (born 1985), American model and ring girl
 Dagmar Braun Celeste (born 1941), American counselor, Christian priest, and author
 Dick Celeste (born 1937), American politician - governor of Ohio 1983–1991
 Erika Celeste, American journalist who has worked in radio, print, and television
 Francis Celeste Le Blond (1821–1902), American politician and a Democratic member of the U.S. House of Representatives
 Madame Céleste (1815–1882), French dancer and actress
 Maria Celeste (1600–1634), born Virginia Galilei, was an Italian Roman Catholic nun
 Michele Celeste, Italian playwright
 Rodrigo Celeste (born 1990), Brazilian football player 
 Shanti Celeste, Chilean DJ from Bristol
 Ted Celeste (born 1945), American politician in Ohio
 Bryan Celeste (born 1996), Filipino mayor from Alaminos

Fictional characters
 Celeste Perrault, fictional character on soap opera Days of Our Lives
 Celeste Cuckoo, a member of the Stepford Cuckoos, Marvel Comics fictional mutant quintuplets
 Celestia Ludenberg (nicknamed Celeste in the official English translation), a character in Danganronpa
 Celeste Montgomery, a character in the film Vox Lux portrayed by Natalie Portman and Raffey Cassidy
 Celeste, the wife and cousin of Babar the Elephant
 Celeste, a toy character from the TV series Doc McStuffins
 Celeste, a former runner from the game Mirror's Edge
 Celeste, Piper's grandmother in the series Orange Is the New Black - Season 2
 Celeste, a minor character from the Six Feet Under TV series played by Michelle Trachtenberg
 Celeste Wright, a character in the TV series Big Little Lies played by actress Nicole Kidman
 Celeste, an NPC in the game Animal Crossing
 Celeste Inpax, a mentioned character in Phoenix Wright: Ace Attorney − Justice for All

See also
 Cecilia, a given name
 Celeste (disambiguation)
 Celestia (name)
 Celia (given name)

References

Feminine given names
Surnames